Galaxy (ギャラクシー) is the twentyeight single released by the Japanese rock band Buck Tick, released on January 14, 2009.

Track listing

Musicians
Atsushi Sakurai - Voice
Hisashi Imai - Guitar
Hidehiko Hoshino - Guitar
Yutaka Higuchi - Bass
Toll Yagami - Drums
Kazutoshi Yokoyama - keyboard

References

2009 singles
2009 songs
Buck-Tick songs
BMG Japan singles
Songs with lyrics by Atsushi Sakurai
Songs with music by Hisashi Imai